Vach station is a railway station in the city of Fürth, located in Bavaria, Germany. The station is on the Nuremberg–Bamberg line of Deutsche Bahn.

References

Railway stations in Bavaria
Buildings and structures in Fürth